Samur may refer to:

People
 Samur Gunj (1380s-c.1455), a daughter of Elbeg Nigülesügchi Khan and his senior wife Kobeguntai

Places
 Qaleh Samur, a village in Gavork-e Sardasht Rural District, in the Central District of Sardasht County, West Azerbaijan Province, Iran
 Samur, Azerbaijan, a village and municipality in the Qusar Rayon of Azerbaijan
 Samur (river), a river in Azerbaijan and Russia
 Samur, Vezirköprü, a village in the Vezirköprü district of Samsun Province, Turkey
 Samur–Absheron channel, an irrigation channel in Azerbaijan 
 Samur-Yalama National Park, a national park of Azerbaijan

Other
 Samur languages
 FNSS Samur, Turkish amphibious armoured vehicle-launched bridge
 SAMUR, an emergency medical service in Spain